Philippe Cavoret (born 11 January 1968 in Aix-les-Bains, Savoie) is a French skeleton racer who competed from 1992 to 2006. Competing in two Winter Olympics, he earned his best finish of 14th in the men's skeleton event at Turin in 2006.

Cavoret's best finish at the FIBT World Championships was seventh twice in the men's skeleton event (2003, 2005). He retired after the 2006 Winter Olympics.

References
2002 men's skeleton results
2006 men's skeleton results
FIBT profile
Skeletonsport.com profile

1968 births
Living people
People from Aix-les-Bains
French male skeleton racers
Skeleton racers at the 2002 Winter Olympics
Skeleton racers at the 2006 Winter Olympics
Olympic skeleton racers of France
Sportspeople from Savoie
20th-century French people
21st-century French people